Rie Takaki (高木 理江 Takaki Rie, born 9 August 1983) is a Japanese volleyball player who plays as vice captain for Victorina Himeji.

Profile
She became a volleyball player at 10 years old.
While attending junior high, she played as a wing-spiker.
While attending high school, the volleyball team won in the Japanese high school league with Megumi Kurihara and Seiko Kawamura.
She served as a captain of JT Marvelous between 2006 and 2009.
In June 2011, she retired from JT Marvelous.
She signed with Victorina Himeji on 2018-07-01

Clubs
 Mitajiri Girls' High School (now MakotoEi high)
 JT Marvelous (2002–2011)
 Victorina Himeji (2018–

Awards

Team 
2003 52nd Kurowashiki All Japan Volleyball Championship -  Runner-Up, with JT Marvelous.
2004 53rd Kurowashiki All Japan Volleyball Championship -  Runner-Up, with JT Marvelous.
2006-2007 V.Premier League -  Runner-Up, with JT Marvelous.
2007 56th Kurowashiki All Japan Volleyball Championship -  Runner-Up, with JT Marvelous.
2009-2010 V.Premier League -  Runner-Up, with JT Marvelous.
2010 59th Kurowashiki All Japan Volleyball Tournament -  Runner-Up, with JT Marvelous.
2010-11 V.Premier League -  Champion, with JT Marvelous.
2011 60th Kurowashiki All Japan Volleyball Tournament -  Champion, with JT Marvelous.

National team

Senior team 
Japan 2002

References

External links
JVA Biography
JT Official Website

Japanese women's volleyball players
Living people
People from Yamaguchi Prefecture
1983 births
JT Marvelous players